Shchigry is the name of several inhabited localities in Russia.

Urban localities
Shchigry, Kursk Oblast, a town in Kursk Oblast incorporated as a town of oblast significance of the same name

Rural localities
Shchigry, Kaluga Oblast, a selo in Zhizdrinsky District of Kaluga Oblast
Shchigry, Kurgan Oblast, a selo in Shchigrovsky Selsoviet of Mokrousovsky District of Kurgan Oblast
Shchigry, Oryol Oblast, a village in Suryaninsky Selsoviet of Bolkhovsky District of Oryol Oblast
Shchigry, Saratov Oblast, a selo in Ivanteyevsky District of Saratov Oblast